Giles Oliver Cairnes Swayne (born Hertfordshire, 30 June 1946) is a British composer.

Biography 
Swayne spent much of his childhood in Liverpool, and began composing at a young age. He was educated at Ampleforth College and at Cambridge University, where he worked with Raymond Leppard and Nicholas Maw before spending three years at the Royal Academy of Music as a student of Harrison Birtwistle, Alan Bush and, once again, Maw. During the years 1976 to 1977 he attended several of Olivier Messiaen's classes at the Paris Conservatoire and from 1981 to 1982 made a study visit to the Gambia and southern Senegal – a formative experience he put to creative use as composer-in-residence to the London borough of Hounslow, 1980–83. Together with his second wife, the Ghanaian, Naaotwa Codjoe, he lived in a village near Accra, Ghana, from 1990 to 1996; he has now settled in London. Swayne is a cousin of Elizabeth Maconchy and Nicola LeFanu.

Selected compositions 
 CRY, opus 27 for 28 solo voices and electronics, commissioned by the BBC and premiered in 1980 (recorded on the label NMC by the BBC Singers conducted by John Poole)
 Magnificat, 1982
 String Quartets 1 – 3 (1971 to 1993) 
 Goodnight Sweet Ladies for soprano and piano, commissioned by Lord Harewood and written 1994–5
 The Silent Land, for cello and choir, premiered in 1998
 HAVOC, for accompanied choir – a sequel to CRY; premiered 1999
 Riff-Raff for organ, premiered in 1983 by Andrew Parnell
 Le Nozze di Cherubino (opera, premiere 22 January 1985 London)

References

External links 
 Autobiography at Gonzaga Publishers Included instead of the biography at Schirmer, which mostly duplicates it.
 Giles Swayne's web-page
Contains biography and complete worklist
 chesternovello.com
List of works published by Novello & Co.
 Review of performance of HAVOC at MusicWeb
Recordings from Giles Swayne's study in The Gambia and Senegal

1946 births
Living people
20th-century classical composers
20th-century English composers
20th-century British male musicians
21st-century classical composers
21st-century British male musicians
English classical composers
English male classical composers
English opera composers
Alumni of the Royal Academy of Music
Alumni of Trinity College, Cambridge
Conservatoire de Paris alumni
Male opera composers
Musicians from Hertfordshire
People educated at Ampleforth College